Fernando (or Hernando) Yáñez de la Almedina, born in Almedina, Spain in c. 1475 and died in Valencia, Kingdom of Spain in 1536, was a Spanish painter. He was one of the most important early Renaissance painters in Spain. Of  supposed morisco origin, he travelled to Italy to study fine art, and in the process became familiar with the work of Leonardo da Vinci. After returning to Spain, he collaborated with Hernando de los Llanos on many works.

References

In Spanish 
 Pedro Miguel Ibáñez Martínez, Fernando Yáñez de Almedina (Universidad de Castilla La Mancha, 1 January 1999)
 Museo Nacional del Prado, "Fernando Yáñez de la Almedina"

Year of birth unknown
1536 deaths
15th-century Spanish painters
Spanish male painters
16th-century Spanish painters
Spanish Renaissance painters
Catholic painters